Khafre (also read as Khafra and  Khephren or Chephren) was an ancient Egyptian King (pharaoh) of the 4th Dynasty during the Old Kingdom. He was the son of Khufu and the successor of Djedefre. According to the ancient historian Manetho, Khafre was followed by king Bikheris, but according to archaeological evidence he was instead followed by king Menkaure. Khafre was the builder who made the second largest pyramid of Giza. The view held by modern Egyptology at large continues to be that the Great Sphinx was built in approximately 2500 BC for Khafre. Not much is known about Khafre, except from the reports of Herodotus, writing 2,000 years after his life.

Family

Khafre was a son of king Khufu and the brother and successor of Djedefre. Khafre is thought by some to be the son of Queen Meritites I due to an inscription where he is said to honor her memory.
Kings-wife, his beloved, devoted to Horus, Mertitytes.
King's-wife, his beloved, Mertitytes; beloved of the Favorite of
the Two Goddesses; she who says anything whatsoever and it is done
for her.  Great in the favor of Snefr[u] ; great in the favor
of Khuf[u], devoted to Horus, honored under Khafre. Merti[tyt]es.[Breasted; Ancient Records]
Others argue that the inscription just suggests that this queen died during the reign of Khafre.  Khafre may be a son of Queen Henutsen instead.

Khafre had several wives and he had at least 12 sons and 3 or 4 daughters. 
 Queen Meresankh III was the daughter of Kawab and Hetepheres II and thus a niece of Khafre. She was the mother of Khafre's sons Nebemakhet, Duaenre, Niuserre and Khentetka, and a daughter named Shepsetkau.
 Queen Khamerernebty I was the mother of Menkaure and his principal queen Khamerernebty II.
 Hekenuhedjet was a wife of Khafre. She is mentioned in the tomb of her son Sekhemkare.
 Persenet may have been a wife of Khafre based on the location of her tomb. She was the mother of Nikaure.

Other children of Khafre are known, but no mothers have been identified. Further sons include Ankhmare, Akhre, Iunmin, and Iunre. Two more daughters named Rekhetre and Hemetre are known as well.

Reign

There is no agreement on the date of his reign. Some authors say it was between 2558 BC and 2532 BC. While the Turin King List length for his reign is blank, and Manetho exaggerates his reign as 66 years, most scholars believe it was between 24 and 26 years, based upon the date of the Will of Prince Nekure which was carved on the walls of this Prince's mastaba tomb. The will is dated anonymously to the Year of the 12th Count and is assumed to belong to Khafre since Nekure was his son. Khafre's highest year date is the "Year of the 13th occurrence" which is a painted date on the back of a  casing stone belonging to mastaba G 7650. This would imply a reign of 24–25 years for this king if the cattle count was biannual during the Fourth Dynasty.

Pyramid complex

Khafre built the second-largest pyramid at Giza. The Egyptian name of the pyramid was Wer(en)-Khafre which means "Khafre is Great".

The pyramid has a subsidiary pyramid, labeled GII a. It is not clear who was buried there. Sealings have been found of a King's eldest son of his body etc. and the Horus name of Khafre.

Valley Temple
The valley temple of Khafre was located closer to the Nile and would have stood right next to the Sphinx temple. Inscriptions from the entrance way have been found which mention Hathor and Bubastis. Blocks have been found showing the partial remains of an inscription with the Horus name of Khafre (Weser-ib). Mariette discovered statues of Khafre in 1860. Several were found in a well in the floor and were headless. But other complete statues were found as well.

Mortuary Temple
The mortuary temple was located very close to the pyramid. From the mortuary temple come fragments of maceheads inscribed with Khafre's name as well as some stone vessels.

Great Sphinx and Sphinx temple
The sphinx is said to date to the time of Khafre. This is supported by the proximity of the sphinx to Khafre's pyramid temple complex, and a certain resemblance (despite damage) to the facial structure seen in his statues. The Great Sphinx of Giza may have been carved out as a guardian of Khafre's pyramid, and as a symbol of royal power. It became deified during the time of the New Kingdom.

Khafre in ancient Greek traditions 
The ancient Egyptian historian Manetho called Khafre “Sûphis II.” and credited him with a rulership of 66 years, but didn't make any further comments about him.

Contrary to modern Egyptologists and archaeological findings, Greek historians Diodorus and Herodotus, writing more than 2,000 years after King Khafre, depicted him as a  tyrant  who had followed his father Khêops on the throne. Herodotus and Diodorus say that Khafre ruled for 56 years.

They describe a king Menkaure (whom they call "Mykerînós") as the follower of Khafre and that this king was the counterpart of his two predecessors: Herodotus describes Menkaure as bringing peace and piety back to Egypt.

Modern Egyptologists evaluate Herodotus's and Diodorus's stories as some sort of defamation, based on both authors' contemporary philosophy. Oversized tombs such as the Giza pyramids must have appalled the Greeks, and even the later priests of the New Kingdom because they surely remembered the heretic pharaoh Akhenaten and his building projects. This extremely negative picture was obviously projected onto Khafre and his daunting pyramid. This view was possibly promoted by the fact that during Khafre's lifetime the authority to give permission for the creation of oversized statues made of precious stone and for their display in open places in public was restricted to the king only. In their eras, the Greek authors and mortuary priests and temple priests couldn't explain the impressive monuments and statues of Khafre as anything other than the result of his character. These views and resulting stories were avidly snapped up by the Greek historians and so they made their also negative evaluations about Khafre, since scandalous stories were easier to sell to the public than positive (and therefore boring) tales.

Of all the rulers of the Old Kingdom, Khafre is evidenced by the greatest number of statues. Almost all of them come from Giza, partly from the official necropolis there, but mainly from the area around the temple complexes of the Khafre pyramid. In a large hall of the valley temple, 23 depressions have been made in the ground, in which originally life-size statues stood. One of these depressions is wider than the others, there may have been two statues here. It has been suggested that these 24 statues are related to the hours of the day. All of these statues were removed from their location at some point after the reign of Khafre. Auguste Mariette found nine of them during excavations in 1860 (Inv.No. CG 9 to CG 17)[21] and fragments of a tenth (CG 378) [22] in a pit within the valley temple. These statues are now in the Egyptian Museum in Cairo.

References

Further reading
 James H. Breasted, Ancient Records of Egypt, Part I, §§ 192, (1906) on 'The Will of Nekure'.

External links

Khefren (Khafre)
Read more and view photos and video of the Pyramid of Khafre at Talking Pyramids

 
26th-century BC Pharaohs
Pharaohs of the Fourth Dynasty of Egypt
3rd-millennium BC births
3rd-millennium BC deaths
Year of birth unknown
Year of death unknown
Place of birth unknown